Spencer Thomas Bassett (4 September 1885 – 11 April 1917) was an English professional football who played as a right half in the Southern League for Exeter City, Swansea Town and Southend United. He made one appearance in the Football League for Woolwich Arsenal.

Personal life 
Bassett attended Earl Street School, near to the Manor Ground. He served as an acting bombardier in the Royal Garrison Artillery during the First World War. On 11 April 1917, Bassett and his unit were at the Arras frontline, providing heavy artillery support for the attack on the village of Bullecourt. During a German counter-shelling, Bassett was mortally wounded and died at the rear of the frontlines. He was buried in Pozières British Cemetery, Ovillers-la-Boisselle.

Career statistics

References 

1885 births
1917 deaths
Footballers from Blackheath, London
English footballers
Association football wing halves
Maidstone United F.C. (1897) players
Arsenal F.C. players
Exeter City F.C. players
Swansea City A.F.C. players
Southend United F.C. players
Southern Football League players
English Football League players
British Army personnel of World War I
British military personnel killed in World War I
Royal Garrison Artillery soldiers
Military personnel from London
Burials in Hauts-de-France